Alle meine Tiere (All My Animals) was a nine-part German family television series about a veterinary practice in the Black Forest which was broadcast on ARD between 1962 and 1963. The main character, the veterinarian, was played by Gustav Knuth.

See also
List of German television series

External links
 

1962 German television series debuts
1963 German television series endings
1962 establishments in West Germany
German-language television shows
Das Erste original programming